Hugo Paul may refer to:

 Hugo Paul (officer), recipient of the Knight's Cross of the Iron Cross
 Hugo Paul (politician) (1905–1962), German politician (KPD)